Skara Brae  is a stone-built Neolithic settlement, located on the Bay of Skaill on the west coast of Mainland, the largest island in the Orkney archipelago of Scotland. Consisting of ten clustered houses, made of flagstones, in earthen dams that provided support for the walls; the houses included stone hearths, beds, and cupboards. A primitive sewer system, with "toilets" and drains in each house,  with water used to flush waste into a drain and out to the ocean. 

The site was occupied from roughly 3180 BC to about 2500 BC and is Europe's most complete Neolithic village. Skara Brae gained UNESCO World Heritage Site status as one of four sites making up "The Heart of Neolithic Orkney". Older than Stonehenge and the Great Pyramids of Giza, it has been called the "Scottish Pompeii" because of its excellent preservation. 

Care of the site is the responsibility of Historic Scotland which works with partners in managing the site: Orkney Islands Council, NatureScot (Scottish Natural Heritage), and the Royal Society for the Protection of Birds. Visitors to the site are welcome during much of the year, 

Uncovered by a storm in 1850, the coastal site may now be at risk from climate change.

Discovery and early exploration
In the winter of 1850, a severe storm hit Scotland causing widespread damage and over 200 deaths. In the Bay of Skaill the storm stripped the earth from a large irregular knoll known as Skara Brae. When the storm cleared, local villagers found the outline of a village consisting of several small houses without roofs. William Watt of Skaill, the local laird, began an amateur excavation of the site, but after four houses were uncovered, work was abandoned in 1868. The site remained undisturbed until 1913 when during a single weekend the site was plundered by a party with shovels who took away an unknown quantity of artifacts. In 1924 another storm swept away part of one of the houses, and it was determined the site should be secured and properly investigated. The job was given to the University of Edinburgh’s Professor V. Gordon Childe, who travelled to Skara Brae for the first time in mid-1927.

Neolithic lifestyle
The inhabitants of Skara Brae were makers and users of grooved ware, a distinctive style of pottery that had recently appeared in northern Scotland. The houses used earth sheltering: built sunk in the ground, into mounds of prehistoric domestic waste known as middens.  This provided the houses with a stability and also acted as insulation against Orkney's harsh winter climate. On average, each house measures  with a large square room containing a stone hearth used for heating and cooking. Given the number of homes, it seems likely that no more than fifty people lived in Skara Brae at any given time.

It is not clear what material the inhabitants burned in their hearths. Childe was sure that the fuel was peat, but a detailed analysis of vegetation patterns and trends suggests that climatic conditions conducive to the development of thick beds of peat did not develop in this part of Orkney until after Skara Brae was abandoned. Other possible fuels include driftwood and animal dung.  There is evidence that dried seaweed may have been used significantly. At some sites in Orkney, investigators have found a glassy, slag-like material called "kelp" or "cramp" which may be residual burnt seaweed.

The dwellings contain a number of stone-built pieces of furniture, including cupboards, dressers, seats, and storage boxes. Each dwelling was entered through a low doorway that had a stone slab door which could be shut "by a bar that slid in bar-holes cut in the stone door jambs." A number of dwellings offered a small connected antechamber, offering access to a partially covered stone drain leading away from the village. It is suggested that these chambers served as indoor privies.

Seven of the houses have similar furniture, with the beds and dresser in the same places in each house. The dresser stands against the wall opposite the door, and was the first thing seen by anyone entering the dwelling. Each of these houses had the larger bed on the right side of the doorway and the smaller on the left. Lloyd Laing noted that this pattern accorded with Hebrides custom up to the early 20th century suggesting that the husband's bed was the larger and the wife's was the smaller. The discovery of beads and paint-pots in some of the smaller beds may support this interpretation. Additional support may come from the recognition that stone boxes lie to the left of most doorways, forcing the person entering the house to turn to the right-hand, "male", side of the dwelling. At the front of each bed lie the stumps of stone pillars that may have supported a canopy of fur; another link with recent Hebridean style.

House 8 has no storage boxes or dresser and has been divided into something resembling small cubicles. Fragments of stone, bone and antler were excavated suggesting the house may have been used to make tools such as bone needles or flint axes. The presence of heat-damaged volcanic rocks and what appears to be a flue, support this interpretation.

The site provided the earliest known record of the human flea (Pulex irritans) in Europe.

The Grooved Ware People who built Skara Brae were primarily pastoralists who raised cattle and sheep. Childe originally believed that the inhabitants did not farm, but excavations in 1972 unearthed seed grains from a midden suggesting that barley was cultivated. Fish bones and shells are common in the middens indicating that dwellers ate seafood. Limpet shells are common and may have been fish-bait that was kept in stone boxes in the homes. The boxes were formed from thin slabs with joints carefully sealed with clay to render them waterproof.

This pastoral lifestyle is in sharp contrast to some of the more exotic interpretations of the culture of the Skara Brae people. Euan MacKie suggested that Skara Brae might be the home of a privileged theocratic class of wise men who engaged in astronomical and magical ceremonies at nearby Ring of Brodgar and the Standing Stones of Stenness. Graham and Anna Ritchie cast doubt on this interpretation noting that there is no archaeological evidence for this claim, although a Neolithic "low road" that goes from Skara Brae passes near both these sites and ends at the chambered tomb of Maeshowe. Low roads connect Neolithic ceremonial sites throughout Britain.

Dating and abandonment
Originally, Childe believed that the settlement dated from around 500 BC. This interpretation was coming under increasing challenge by the time new excavations in 1972–73 settled the question. Radiocarbon results obtained from samples collected during these excavations indicate that occupation of Skara Brae began about 3180 BC with occupation continuing for about six hundred years. Around 2500 BC, after the climate changed, becoming much colder and wetter, the settlement may have been abandoned by its inhabitants. There are many theories as to why the people of Skara Brae left; particularly popular interpretations involve a major storm. Evan Hadingham combined evidence from found objects with the storm scenario to imagine a dramatic end to the settlement:

Anna Ritchie strongly disagrees with catastrophic interpretations of the village's abandonment:

The site was farther from the sea than it is today, and it is possible that Skara Brae was built adjacent to a fresh water lagoon protected by dunes. Although the visible buildings give an impression of an organic whole, it is certain that an unknown quantity of additional structures had already been lost to sea erosion before the site's rediscovery and subsequent protection by a seawall. Uncovered remains are known to exist immediately adjacent to the ancient monument in areas presently covered by fields, and others, of uncertain date, can be seen eroding out of the cliff edge a little to the south of the enclosed area.

Artifacts

A number of enigmatic carved stone balls have been found at the site and some are on display in the museum. Similar objects have been found throughout northern Scotland. The spiral ornamentation on some of these "balls" has been stylistically linked to objects found in the Boyne Valley in Ireland. Similar symbols have been found carved into stone lintels and bed posts. These symbols, sometimes referred to as "runic writings", have been subjected to controversial translations. For example, author Rodney Castleden suggested that "colons" found punctuating vertical and diagonal symbols may represent separations between words.

Lumps of red ochre found here and at other Neolithic sites have been interpreted as evidence that body painting may have been practised. 

Nodules of haematite with highly polished surfaces have been found as well; the shiny surfaces suggest that the nodules were used to finish leather.

These pins are very similar to examples found in passage graves in the Boyne Valley, another piece of evidence suggesting a linkage between the two cultures. So-called Skaill knives were commonly used tools in Skara Brae; these consist of large flakes knocked off sandstone cobbles. Skaill knives have been found throughout Orkney and Shetland.

The 1972 excavations reached layers that had remained waterlogged and had preserved items that otherwise would have been destroyed. These include a twisted skein of Heather, one of a very few known examples of Neolithic rope, and a wooden handle.

Related sites in Orkney
A comparable, though smaller, site exists at Rinyo on Rousay. Unusually, no Maeshowe-type tombs have been found on Rousay and although there are a large number of Orkney–Cromarty chambered cairns, these were built by Unstan ware people.

Knap of Howar, on the Orkney island of Papa Westray, is a well-preserved Neolithic farmstead. Dating from 3500 BC to 3100 BC, it is similar in design to Skara Brae, but from an earlier period, and it is thought to be the oldest preserved standing building in northern Europe.

There is also a site currently under excavation at Links of Noltland on Westray that appears to have similarities to Skara Brae.

World Heritage status

"The Heart of Neolithic Orkney" was inscribed as a World Heritage site in December 1999. In addition to Skara Brae the site includes Maeshowe, the Ring of Brodgar, the Standing Stones of Stenness and other nearby sites. It is managed by Historic Environment Scotland, whose "Statement of Significance" for the site begins:

Some areas and facilities were closed due to the worldwide COVID-19 pandemic during parts of 2020 and into 2021.

Risk from climate change
In 2019, a risk assessment was performed to assess the site's vulnerability to climate change. The report by Historic Environment Scotland, the Orkney Islands Council and others concludes that the entire Heart of Neolithic Orkney World Heritage Site, and in particular Skara Brae, is "extremely vulnerable" to climate change due to rising sea levels, increased rainfall and other factors; it also highlights the risk that Skara Brae could be partially destroyed by one unusually severe storm.

In popular culture

The 1968 children's novel The Boy with the Bronze Axe by Kathleen Fidler is set during the last days of Skara Brae. This theme is also adopted by Rosemary Sutcliff in her 1977 novel Shifting Sands, in which the evacuation of the site is portrayed as unhurried, with most of the inhabitants surviving.
The Irish Celtic folk group Skara Brae took their name from the settlement. Active between 1970 and 1971, their only album Skara Brae was released in 1971, and reissued on CD in 1998.
A stone was unveiled in Skara Brae on 12 April 2008 marking the anniversary of Russian cosmonaut Yuri Gagarin becoming the first man to orbit the Earth in 1961.
 The video game The Bard's Tale takes place in a highly fictionalized version of Skara Brae.
The video game Starsiege: Tribes features an iconic map named "Scarabrae."
The video game series Ultima includes the city of Skara Brae, which is on an island to the west of the main continent. It is devoted to the virtue of Spirituality, located next to a moongate and is the home of Shamino the Ranger.
 In Kim Stanley Robinson's 1991 novelette A History of the Twentieth Century, with Illustrations, the main character visits Skara Brae and other Orkney Island neolithic sites as part of a journey he takes to gain perspective on the violent history of the 20th century.
 In the film Indiana Jones and the Kingdom of the Crystal Skull, Jones is shown lecturing to his students about the site, where he gives the date as "3100 B.C."
Skara Brae is used as the name for a New York Scottish pub in the IDW Teenage Mutant Ninja Turtles comic series.

See also 

 Maeshowe
 Ness of Brodgar
 Standing Stones of Stenness
 The Crucible of Iron Age Shetland
 Timeline of prehistoric Scotland
 List of oldest buildings
 List of oldest buildings in the United Kingdom
 List of World Heritage Sites in Scotland

Notes

References

Bibliography

External links

 Skaill House, Bay of Skaill, home of excavator William Watt

4th-millennium BC architecture in Scotland
Populated places established in the 4th millennium BC
Archaeological sites in Orkney
Prehistoric Orkney
Buildings and structures in Orkney
Scheduled monuments in Scotland
Stone Age sites in Scotland
World Heritage Sites in Scotland
Neolithic settlements
Megalithic monuments in Scotland
Former populated places in Scotland
Historic Scotland properties in Orkney
Museums in Orkney
Archaeological museums in Scotland
History museums in Scotland
Neolithic Scotland
Semi-subterranean structures
4th-millennium BC establishments
Mainland, Orkney
Heart of Neolithic Orkney